This is list of the nominees that the New Progressive Party has ticketed for the post of governor of Puerto Rico throughout history.
 style="margin: 0 auto"
! scope=col style="text-align: left" | #
! scope=col style="text-align: left" | Portrait
! scope=col style="text-align: left" | Name
! scope=col style="text-align: left" | Election
! scope=col style="text-align: left" | Result
! scope=col style="text-align: left" | Remarks
|-
! scope=row | 1
| 
| Luis A. Ferré
| 1968
| won
|
|-
! scope=row | 2
| 
| Luis A. Ferré
| 1972
| lost
|
|-
! scope=row | 3
| 
| Carlos Romero Barceló
| 1976
| won
|
|-
! scope=row | 4
| 
| Carlos Romero Barceló
| 1980
| won
|
|-
! scope=row | 5
| 
| Carlos Romero Barceló
| 1984
| lost
|
|-
! scope=row | 6
| 
| Baltasar Corrada del Río
| 1988
| lost
|
|-
! scope=row | 7
| 
| Pedro Rosselló
| 1992
| won
|
|-
! scope=row | 8
| 
| Pedro Rosselló
| 1996
| won
| largest winning landslide by the party up to then
|-
! scope=row | 9
| 
| Carlos Pesquera
| 2000
| lost
|
|-
! scope=row | 10
| 
| Pedro Rosselló
| 2004
| lost
| lost the governorship by 3,566 votes, but his party wins the House of Representative and Senate, Resident Commissioner, 42 City Hall 23rd Senate of Puerto Rico
|-
! scope=row | 11
| 
| Luis Fortuño
| 2008
| won
| largest winning landslide by the party ever
|-
! scope=row | 12
| 
| Luis Fortuño
| 2012
| lost
| 0.6% margin loss
|-
! scope=row | 13
| 
| Ricardo Rosselló
| 2016
| won
| received 655,626 votes
|-
! scope=row | 14
| 
| Pedro Pierluisi
| 2020
| won
| received 427,016 votes
|-

References

New Progressive Party (Puerto Rico)
Lists of Puerto Rican politicians